Maria Josepha of Austria (Maria Josepha Colletta Antonia; 6 March 1687 – 14 April 1703) was the penultimate child of Leopold I, Holy Roman Emperor and his third wife, Eleonor Magdalene of the Palatinate.

Biography
Born at the Hofburg Palace in Vienna, Austria, she was the fifth daughter of Leopold I, Holy Roman Emperor and Eleonor Magdalene of Neuburg. Two of her siblings became Holy Roman Emperors, Joseph and Charles, and her elder sister, Maria Anna, became the Queen of Portugal, while her other sisters Maria Elisabeth and Maria Magdalena became Governors of the Austrian Netherlands and Tyrol respectively.

Death
On 14 April 1703, Maria Josepha died of smallpox at the age of sixteen, and was buried in the Imperial Crypt, while her heart was placed in the Herzgruft at the Augustinian Church, Vienna.

Ancestors

References

1687 births
1703 deaths
17th-century House of Habsburg
18th-century House of Habsburg
17th-century Austrian women
18th-century Austrian women
Burials at the Imperial Crypt
Burials at St. Stephen's Cathedral, Vienna
Austrian princesses
Nobility from Vienna
Deaths from smallpox
Daughters of emperors
Royalty and nobility who died as children
Children of Leopold I, Holy Roman Emperor
Daughters of kings